Lonnie Hepburn (born May 12, 1949) is a former American football defensive back. He played for the Baltimore Colts from 1971 to 1972 and for the Denver Broncos in 1974.

References

1949 births
Living people
American football defensive backs
Texas Southern Tigers football players
Baltimore Colts players
Denver Broncos players